William Lee Plunket, 5th Baron Plunket  (19 December 1864 – 24 January 1920) was a British diplomat and administrator. He was Governor of New Zealand from 1904 to 1910.

Early life
Born in Dublin, he was educated at Harrow and Trinity College Dublin. His parents were William, 4th Lord Plunket, the archbishop of Dublin in 1884–97, and his wife Anne, the daughter of Sir Benjamin Guinness.

He entered the Diplomatic Service and was sent to Rome in 1889 as an attaché to the British Embassy there. In 1892, he was appointed in the same position to the embassy in Constantinople, and finally retired two years later.

Career
Having succeeded his father as fifth Baron Plunket in 1897, Plunket three years later became private secretary to Lord Cadogan, Lord Lieutenant of Ireland at the time, and fulfilled the same role for his successor Lord Dudley, when he was appointed to the position in August 1902. He was appointed CVO and KCVO in 1900 and 1903 respectively, and in 1904 he became Governor of New Zealand as well as a KCMG the following year. By chance, the Speaker of the New Zealand House of Representatives at the time was his second cousin Arthur Guinness. He held this post until 1910, when he was advanced to GCMG. In 1907 he presented the Plunket Shield, which is still contested each year by the major cricket teams in New Zealand. He was later appointed KBE in 1918.

Freemasonry
He was a Freemason. During his term as Governor of New Zealand (1906-1909), he was also Grand Master of New Zealand's Grand Lodge.

Death
Lord Plunket died on 24 January 1920 aged 55 at 40 Elvaston Place, London, and was buried in the city's Putney Vale Cemetery.

Family
Plunket married, in 1894, Lady Victoria Alexandrina Hamilton-Temple-Blackwood, youngest daughter of the 1st Marquess of Dufferin and Ava, by whom he was to have eight children. Victoria gave her name to the Plunket Society, a New Zealand society promoting the health and well-being of mothers and children and was a patron of the Mothercraft Training Society.

References

Alumni of Trinity College Dublin
Plunket, William Lee
Barons in the Peerage of the United Kingdom
Eldest sons of British hereditary barons
Plunket, William Lee Plunket, 5th Baron
Plunket, William Lee Plunket, 5th Baron
Plunket, William Lee Plunket, 5th Baron
People educated at Harrow School
New Zealand Freemasons
Plunket, William Lee Plunket, 5th Baron
Plunket, William Lee Plunket, 5th Baron